Okgu Line() is a cargo branch line from Gunsan Port Line, connecting from GunsanOksan station to Okgu station.  Okgu line is registered in distance post, but suspended as cargo or passenger transportation several years ago This line was virtually closed status, but April 1, 2011, resumed cargo transport.

Line information 
 Total Line length : 7.9 km
 Line Operator : Korail
 Rail Gauge : 1435mm (Standard gauge)
 Number of Stations : 2
 Double-track section : None (Whole Single track)
 Electrificated section : None

Station list

History 
Okgu line was supply railway for United Nations peacekeeping(Seventh Air Force) in Gunsan Airfield. May 20, 1952, construction of Okgu line began by UN army, and finished construction at February 25, 1953. Operation of Okgu line started March 9. Okgu line also did the corn transport to Gunsan Port.

For some time, bidulgiho was operated in line, 6 times per day. But passenger transportation was suspended in 1990s. And cargo transportation also suspended in 2000. In 2011, Haiman(Company that responsibility for Airfield supply) requested train operation, so cargo train occasionally operating for now.

Original name at line open was Gunsan Airfield Line(群山飛行場線), but name changed to Okgu line at September 1, 1955.

Timeline 
 1952/5/20 : Gunsan Airfield Line construction began by United Nation
 1953/2/25 : Gunsan Airfield Line construction finished
 1953/3/9 : Operation began
 1955/9/1 : Name changed to Okgu Line
 1970/6/11 : Passenger transportation suspended
 2000/11/15 : Train operation suspended
 2011/4/1 : Train operation resumed
 2020/12/10 : Its eastern terminus was changed from Gunsan Hwamul Station to GunsanOksan Station.

See also
 Korail
 Gunsan Hwamul Line
 Gunsan Port Line

References

External links 
 "Okgu Station" in korail
 Okgu Line investigation by Shinzino

 
Railway lines opened in 1953